Once Upon a Tour was the third world tour by Finnish symphonic metal band Nightwish, in 2004 and 2005, to promote the release of their fifth album, Once, released June 7, 2004. A new greatest hits compilation, Highest Hopes, was also released to tie in with the tour. The albums combined with the band's most expansive merchandise campaign by Nuclear Blast Records meant this tour was heralded as the band's most important in many years. Many of the band's songs had not been played in a long time.

Background
The success of the album allowed the band to perform in many countries they had never visited before: Colombia, Ecuador, Scotland, Estonia, Greece, Romania, Denmark, Japan, Australia, Portugal, and Slovenia. The band also played their first tour in the United States, with various sold-out concerts; the South American leg also sold out all its concerts. A second tour was planned in the US, but it was cancelled by Tarja Turunen, who also cancelled some concerts in Australia. Nightwish performed at the opening ceremony of the 2005 World Championships in Athletics held in Helsinki, highlighting the acclaim the band had recently gained.

After touring in Europe and South America in late 2004, and some separate shows in December, the band had some time off in January 2005. In February, Nightwish won five Emma-Gala Awards (Finnish Grammy); among other awards, they won "The Band of the Year" and "The Best Selling Album of the Year". Tuomas Holopainen and Marko Hietala flew to Helsinki to receive the awards from touring in Europe. In March, Nightwish performed for the first time in Japan and Australia; in April and May, they had to have a break because of Turunen's other interests; but at the end of May, the band resumed the tour by playing with Iron Maiden in Poland and Mötley Crüe in Norway. During late 2005, Nightwish played several shows including a sold-out performance at the legendary Hammersmith Apollo in London. The last show on the European tour, in Stuttgart, Germany was up until then their biggest gig, with an audience of ten thousand.

The final concert was played on October 21 for 11,500 people in Hartwall Areena in Helsinki. The concert was also recorded to be released as an End of an Era live DVD and CD.

This was the last tour with Tarja Turunen; after the last concert the four other members of Nightwish decided it was best to continue Nightwish without Turunen, a feeling they expressed through an open letter Holopainen gave Turunen after the show, afterwards posted on the band's website. It was written by Holopainen but signed by the other band members. The main justification for Turunen's dismissal given in the letter was the band felt both her husband Marcelo Cabuli (an Argentine businessman) and commercial interests had changed her attitude towards the band. In May 2007, former Alyson Avenue frontwoman Anette Olzon was revealed as Turunen's replacement.

Setlist

Tour dates

Personnel

 Tarja Turunen – lead vocals
 Tuomas Holopainen – keyboards
 Emppu Vuorinen – guitar
 Jukka Nevalainen – drums
 Marko Hietala – bass, vocals

Additional musician
 John Two-Hawks – vocals, flute

References

Sources

External links
Nightwish Official Website

2004 concert tours
2005 concert tours
Nightwish concert tours